Irma Records is an Italian record label founded in Bologna in 1989. It releases alternative acoustic lounge and dance music. It currently has offices in both Bologna, Italy and Tokyo, Japan.

Artists

Sakai Asuka
Angelica
Simon Baker
Banda Brasileira
Baron Bane
Belladonna (Maurizio Belladonna)
Big Mojo
Black & Brown
Black Mighty Orchestra
Matteo Brancaleoni
Ely Bruna
Capiozzo, Mecco & Santimone
Captain Mantell
Don Carlos
CL (Colin Lindo a.k.a. Alpha Omega & Nubian Mindz)
Crazy P
Deodato
DJ Black Mighty Wax
DJ Rodriguez
Elmio
eRika
Feather and Down
Franca Barone 5et
Freetempo
From P60
Maestro Garofalo
Gazzara
Greenlab
Honeymunch
Ida Landsberg
I-Dep
Italian Secret Service
Jacare'
Jeannie
Jeni Fujita (of The Fugees)
Jestofunk
Jhameel
Bengi Jumping
Kaleido
Kalweit & the Spokes
Ithamara Koorax
Danny Losito
Les Jeux Sont Funk
Low Fidelity Jet-Set Orchestra
Ltj Experience
Lumiere
Maddalena
Maler
Agnesse Manganaro
Amana Melone
Modulo 5
Diego Montinaro
Sarah Jane Morris
M-Swift
Musetta
Ninfa
Nu Braz
Ohm Guru
Ortiz
O’Spada
Papik
Robert Passera
Sophie Lillienne
The Piano Room
Pinktronix
Polyphonics
Provköket
Rigo
Riovolt
Steve Rogers Band
Max Sedgley
The Shiffers
Silvia's Magic Hands
The Snipplers
Sobo & Zeb
Soul Quality Quartet
Spirit Catcher
Stalker Studio
Stockholm Cyclo
Sugarpie & The Candymen
Summer Twins
Supabeatz
Supersonix Cinematica
Aaron Tesser
2 Men 4 Soul
John Type
United Peace Voices
Woomin
yuma
Zerosospiro
Zone

References
Footnotes

Further reading
Pierfrancesco Pacoda, Sulle rotte del rave: DJ’s party e piste da ballo da Goa a Londra, da Bali a Ibiza, Milano, Feltrinelli, 2002, .
Pierfrancesco Pacoda, Potere alla parola: Antologia del rap italiano, Milano, Feltrinelli, 1996, .
Alessandro Bolli, Dizionario dei Nomi Rock, Padova, Arcana editrice, 1998, .
Mario De Luigi, Storia dell'industria fonografica in Italia, Milano, Musica e Dischi, 2008, .

External links
Official site
Official Japanese site
Discogs page for label
Official YouTube channel 

Italian record labels
Japanese record labels
Jazz record labels
House music record labels
World music record labels
Folk record labels
Electronic music record labels
Psychedelic trance record labels
Pop record labels
Easy listening record labels
Smooth jazz record labels
Soundtrack record labels
Hip hop record labels
Electronic dance music record labels
Experimental music record labels